Michal Sipľak (born 2 February 1996) is a Slovak professional footballer who plays as a left-back for Cracovia.

Club career

ŠK Slovan Bratislava
Sipľak made his Corgoň Liga debut for Slovan Bratislava on 31 May 2014 entering in as a substitute in place of Róbert Matejka against Spartak Trnava.

Cracovia
On 7 July 2017 he signed a contract with Cracovia Kraków.

International career
Sipľak spent some of his under-21 international career under Pavel Hapal. The same coach surprisingly nominated him to senior national team on 12 March 2019, for a double UEFA Euro 2020 qualifying against Hungary and Wales. He was nominated to replace the long-term international left-back and recently retired Tomáš Hubočan.

Honours

Club
Cracovia
 Polish Cup: 2019–20

References

External links
 ŠK Slovan Bratislava profile
 
 Futbalnet profile
 
 

1996 births
Living people
Slovak footballers
Association football defenders
ŠK Slovan Bratislava players
Partizán Bardejov players
MFK Zemplín Michalovce players
MKS Cracovia (football) players
Slovak Super Liga players
Ekstraklasa players
Expatriate footballers in Poland
Slovak expatriate sportspeople in Poland
People from Bardejov
Sportspeople from the Prešov Region
Slovakia under-21 international footballers
Slovak expatriate footballers